Windows Anytime Upgrade (Add Features to Windows) was a discontinued service by Microsoft introduced in Windows Vista that facilitated upgrades across successive editions of Windows Vista. Prices for upgrades purchased through Windows Anytime Upgrade were lower than prices for upgrades purchased at retail.
Windows Anytime Upgrade is included in Windows 7 to allow users to upgrade to Windows 7 editions. In Windows 8 and Windows 8.1 it was rebranded as Add Features to Windows and was used to purchase an upgrade license for the Pro edition or to add Windows Media Center to an existing Pro installation. Support for this feature was discontinued on October 31, 2015. However, if the user got an upgrade key before the discontinuation date, the tool still works on Windows 7.

History

Windows Anytime Upgrade was in development prior to the development reset of Windows Vista, then known by its codename "Longhorn." A preliminary version of the feature can be seen in build 4093.

On February 26, 2006, Microsoft announced the editions of Windows Vista to be released to retail and original equipment manufacturers (OEMs). After this announcement, various technology-related outlets reported that Anytime Upgrade would enable users to upgrade to successive editions.

Overview

Windows Vista

All editions of Windows Vista (excluding Enterprise) are stored on the same retail and OEM optical media—a license key for the edition purchased determines which edition is eligible for installation. When first announced, Anytime Upgrade enabled users to purchase a digital license from an online merchant to upgrade their edition of Windows Vista. Once a license had been purchased, a user's product license, billing and other information would be stored within a user's digital locker at the Windows Marketplace digital distribution platform; this would allow a user to retain this information at an off-site location for reference purposes and to reinstall the operating system, if necessary. A user could then initiate an upgrade to the edition for which the license was purchased either through components stored on the hard drive by the OEM of the personal computer, through an Anytime Upgrade DVD supplied by the OEM, or through retail installation media compatible with Anytime Upgrade. If none of these options were available, Anytime Upgrade provided an option for a user to purchase a DVD online and have it delivered by mail.

Microsoft also released retail packaging for Anytime Upgrade. The retail products were made available during the consumer launch of Windows Vista on January 30, 2007. The initial version of these products included only an upgrade license, but this was later modified in May 2007 to include both a DVD and a product license. In an effort to streamline the upgrade process, Microsoft announced that digital license distribution would cease on February 20, 2008; licenses purchased prior to this date would not be affected. As a result of this change, users would be required to purchase the aforementioned retail packaging in order to use Anytime Upgrade functionality and Windows Vista Service Pack 1 omitted the option to purchase a license online. DVDs for Anytime Upgrade were only produced for Windows Vista.

Anytime Upgrade in Windows Vista performs a full reinstallation of the new product edition while retaining the user's data, programs, and settings. This process can take a considerable amount of time, up to a few hours.

Windows 7

Anytime Upgrade in Windows 7 no longer performs a full reinstallation of Windows. Components for the upgraded editions are instead pre-installed directly in the operating system; a notable result of this change is that the speed of the upgrade process has been significantly increased. Microsoft stated that an upgrade should take approximately 10 minutes. Anytime Upgrade also does not require physical media or additional software. Instead, Windows 7 requires a user to purchase a license online, in a manner similar to the initial functionality that was later removed from Windows Vista starting with Service Pack 1. Microsoft would also release Anytime Upgrade packaging for Windows 7 at retail. The packaging, however, would only include a license for the edition to be upgraded, as Anytime Upgrade in the operating system does not require physical media.

Windows 8 and later 
In Windows 8, the process has changed. Users will need to go to the Control Panel and search for Add Features to Windows. In Windows 10, this is located in Settings > System > About > Change Product Key or Upgrade Your Version of Windows.

Results after upgrading 
This process works the same way as in Windows 7, with a few exceptions:

 If a user purchases a new PC with Windows 8 or later preinstalled, and then the user upgrades that PC with a Windows 8 Pro Pack, Windows 8 Media Center Pack, a volume license edition, or a retail edition, he/she will no longer be able to install apps that are provided exclusively from the OEM  through the Microsoft Store.
 On Windows 10, when upgrading from Windows 10 Home to Pro or from Home to Pro for Workstations, in addition to the above consequence, the upgraded PC will no longer be supported and is no longer entitled to receive firmware updates from the OEM, even though it will still get Windows operating system updates. Damages that occur due to Windows edition upgrades are not covered under the manufacturer's warranty. However, if the user buys a PC with Windows 10 Pro installed and later upgrades that PC to Pro for Workstations, these consequences do not apply.

Region availability
When first announced, Anytime Upgrade was available in the United States, Canada, EMEA, European Union, Norway, Switzerland, and Japan, with Microsoft stating that availability of the program would expand after launch of Windows Vista. English version retail packaging for Anytime Upgrade was made available at the consumer launch of Windows Vista for North America and Asia-Pacific regions.

In 2009, Ars Technica reported that Anytime Upgrade retail packaging for Windows 7 may only have been available in regions without broadband Internet access or where retail packaging was ineligible to be offered. Anytime Upgrade was available for Windows 7 in select regions.

OEM availability 
Because of some issues that will occur after performing a Windows Anytime Upgrade, not all device manufacturers support this feature, including the following:

 Huawei MateBook (discontinued on July 25, 2018)
 LG Gram (discontinued on December 31, 2021)

Impacts of upgrading 
Many PC manufacturers have a version and edition of Windows that is fully certified, tested and optimized for their hardware. Performing an edition upgrade will change the software and execute programs not verified by the OEM. This creates some risks, but it is useful for users to add additional features including Hyper-V virtualization, business management and deployment, and other features not present in the current edition of Windows.

Warranty 
As the proper operation of the hardware with Windows editions not officially supported cannot be guaranteed by the manufacturer, it is not able to maintain the full scope of warranty for the user’s device after he/she has performed an edition upgrade. Because of this, the OEM has a responsibility to warn the user that defects which may result from, or were caused by upgraded Windows editions may not be covered by the manufacturer’s warranty or any extended service plans that the user may have purchased. This is because the license type will no longer be an OEM license after the upgrade. Additionally, due to the modified device software, the manufacturer’s repair network will likely have to replace key components before it can properly test, repair and verify the device using their own repair tools and software. Consequently, if the manufacturer does perform a warranty repair, it will likely charge the user a significant service fee for the additional costs caused by the upgraded edition of the OS.

Limitations 
The device manufacturer can no longer guarantee the full functionality of the device after performing an edition upgrade. This may cause unexpected side effects that may include but are not limited to the following:

 The device may stop working completely.
 Certain features and functionalities may be disabled.
 The device may become unsafe to the point of causing the user harm.
 The device becomes physically damaged due to overheating.
 The behavior of the device may be altered.
 Some content on the device may no longer be accessible or playable due to invalid DRM keys.
 Some user data, settings, and accounts may disappear. Therefore, a data backup is recommended.
 Software updates delivered via FOTA (Firmware Over the Air) or Web Download services may not work on the device anymore. For example, the user can no longer receive any more firmware updates from the manufacturer itself.

The device manufacturer will not be responsible for the damages caused by any edition upgrades being installed to the user’s PC.

Furthermore, applications which require a trusted execution environment (TEE) to operate will not work properly because after performing an edition upgrade, the device will no longer be trusted. For example, on Samsung Galaxy Book devices, performing an edition upgrade will cause the Knox fuse to be blown (0x1), causing some apps like Samsung Pay and Samsung Secure Folder to no longer work, just like with their Android devices.

Upgrading the edition will also affect the DRM protection of the device. Therefore, some applications which require DRM protection may not work anymore or block certain functions due to this untrusted state. Common examples for affected applications are services which offer download/streaming of paid multimedia content like music and movies or services offering mobile payment.

Security risks 
Using an upgraded edition of Windows may lead to monetary damages due to viruses, malwares, and leakage of personal information from hacking. The user will be responsible for all such damages that occur after upgrading the edition.

Alternatives 
If a higher edition of Windows is available, the user is recommended to choose it from the very beginning when purchasing a new PC to avoid these possible risks.

See also
 Windows Easy Transfer
 Windows Vista editions
 Windows Ultimate Extras
 Windows 7 editions

References

Discontinued Windows components